The 2010 Colorado Ice season was the team's fourth season as a professional indoor football franchise and second in the Indoor Football League (IFL). One of twenty-five teams that competed in the IFL in the 2010 season, the Fort Collins-based Colorado Ice were members of the United Conference.

Founded in 2007 as part of United Indoor Football, the Colorado Ice became charter members of the IFL when the UIF merged with the Intense Football League before the 2009 season. In their fourth season under head coach Collins Sanders, the team played their home games at the Budweiser Events Center in Loveland, Colorado.

On April 1, 2010, Thomas Wrigley purchased the team.

Linebacker Landon Jones was named the IFL Defensive Rookie of the Year at the conclusion of the season.

Schedule
Key:

Regular season
All start times are local time

Standings

Roster

References

External links
Colorado Ice official statistics
Colorado Ice at Loveland Reporter-Herald
Colorado Ice at Fort Collins Coloradoan

Colorado Ice
Colorado Crush (IFL)
Colorado Ice